Breeders is a dark comedy television series created by Martin Freeman, Chris Addison and Simon Blackwell. The series follows two parents who struggle with parenthood and is partially based on Freeman's own experiences. Freeman plays one of the two leads in the series.

The series premiered on March 2, 2020, on the American cable network FX, and on the British network Sky One on March 12, 2020. On May 18, 2020, the series was renewed for a second season which premiered on March 22, 2021. On May 27, 2021, the series was renewed for a third season which premiered on May 9, 2022. On July 19, 2022, the series was renewed for a fourth season.

Cast

Main 
 Martin Freeman as Paul Worsley, a father of two and Ally's partner
 Daisy Haggard as Ally Grant, a mother of two and Paul's partner

Supporting 
 George Wakeman (season 1; guest season 2–3) and Alex Eastwood (season 2–present) as Luke, Paul and Ally's son
 Jayda Eyles (season 1; guest season 2–3) and Eve Prenelle (season 2–present) as Ava, Paul and Ally's daughter
 Joanna Bacon as Jackie, Paul's mother
 Alun Armstrong as Jim, Paul's father
 Stella Gonet as Leah, Ally's mother
 Patrick Baladi as Darren, Paul and Ally's friend
 Michael McKean as Michael (season 1), Ally's estranged father

Recurring 
 Tim Steed as Carl, Paul and Ally's next-door neighbour
 Hugh Quarshie as Alex (season 2-present), Leah’s new husband
 Jordan A. Nash as Jacob (season 2-present), Alex’s son and Luke’s friend
 Aliyah Sesay as Grace (season 2-present), Ava’s friend
 Sally Phillips as Gabby (season 3), Leah’s neighbour

Episodes

Season 1 (2020)

Season 2 (2021)

Season 3 (2022)

Production

Development 
On March 7, 2018, it was announced that Avalon Television was developing a comedy series created by Martin Freeman. The series was originally a co-production between the BBC and FX, similar to the drama series Taboo. A pilot was already filmed at the time of the announcement. On October 14, 2018, it was announced that FX and Sky (the latter replacing the BBC) had commissioned the series with ten half-hour episodes, with a series debut in 2020. On January 20, 2020, FX announced that the series would premiere on March 2, 2020.

On May 18, 2020, the series was renewed for a second season which premiered on March 22, 2021. On May 27, 2021, the series was renewed for a third season. On July 19, 2022, the series was renewed for a fourth season.

Casting 
Alongside the series announcement, it was announced that Freeman would star in the series. Furthermore, Daisy Haggard and Michael Gambon were also cast in the series. However, on April 21, 2019, it was reported that Gambon left the series as he was having trouble memorising his lines due to memory loss issues.

Filming 
Filming for the second season had been delayed by sixteen weeks due to the COVID-19 pandemic. Following the delay, filming for the second season began on September 1, 2020, in London, and concluded production on December 18, 2020. Season 3 began filming in November 2021 and concluded filming in March 2022.

Release 
The series premiered on March 2, 2020, on FX in the United States and Canada. The series premiere coincided with the launch of FX on Hulu and therefore the series became the first FX series with episodes available on Hulu by the next day. In Bulgaria and Poland, the series airs on HBO Europe. The series was formerly broadcast in Australia on Foxtel, via its broadcast network FOX One and on demand services until May 2022. It comes as Disney is looking forward to reclaiming its FX and 20th Television titles in order to stream them exclusively on the company's service: Disney+. Breeders Moved to Disney+ on June 1, 2022. Soon after Breeders Departed Foxtel and its Service, Season 3 moved to streaming on June 15, 2022, exclusively on Disney+ as a Star Original with new episodes airing on a weekly basis.

Reception

Critical response 
On the review aggregation website Rotten Tomatoes, the series holds a 91% approval rating with the website's critics consensus reading, "A provocative addition to the growing slate of shows about parents behaving badly, Breeders take on the realities of child-rearing are as hilarious as they are cringe-inducing." Metacritic, which uses a weighted average, has assigned the series a score of 65 out of 100 based on 13 critics, indicating "generally favorable reviews."

Accolades

References

External links 
 
 

2020 American television series debuts
2020 British television series debuts
2020s American black comedy television series
2020s British black comedy television series
English-language television shows
FX Networks original programming
Sky UK original programming
Television series about families
Television series by 20th Century Fox Television
Parenting television series